"Ordinary Day" is the lead single taken from Dolores O'Riordan's debut album, Are You Listening?. The single was the most added AAA track on US radio stations. The single peaked at number two in Italy, number 1 in Croatia and number 10 in Lebanon.

Music video
The music video was directed by Caswell Cloggins and was filmed in Prague. It features a little girl somewhat resembling Little Red Riding Hood. The music video debuted on 17 March 2007 on the Spanish music channel and radio Los 40 principales, and peaked at #27 on their music countdown.

Track listing
CD single
(5 016073 901002; 30 April 2007)
Ordinary Day – 4:04
Without You – 4:08
Ordinary Day (Video) – 3:54
7" single
(5 016073 901071; 30 April 2007)
Ordinary Day – 4:04
Forever – 3:40
USA iTunes single
(13 March 2007)
Ordinary Day – 4:05
Black Widow – 4:56
Letting Go – 5:45

Charts

References

External links
"Ordinary Day" Music Video

2007 singles
2007 songs
Irish rock songs
Songs written by Dolores O'Riordan